

Events
Antonino "Tony," "Joe Batters" Accardo decides to retire from the Chicago Outfit and appoints Salvatore "Sam," "Mooney" Giancana to oversee day-to-day operations of the crime syndicate. However, Accardo remains a presence in the organization serving in an advisory capacity and usually has the final say on all important Outfit business and "hits".
Carlo Gambino is made underboss by Albert Anastasia, in what would later become the Gambino crime family.
January 3 – Unable to convince federal officials of his citizenship, Joe Adonis agrees to comply with his deportation to Italy in agreement to drop the perjury charges. With the departure of Adonis, the struggle of the Frank Costello–Albert Anastasia faction to gain control over the Luciano crime family from Vito Genovese grows even more desperate.
Frank DeSimone becomes leader of the Los Angeles crime family following the death of Jack Dragna.
April 5 – After journalist Victor Riesel is assaulted and blinded with acid, mobster  Johnny Dio is charged with the attack. However police are forced to drop the charges when witnesses against him disappeared or retracted their statements. Despite this, Riesel would continue his crusade against organized crime though radio and newspaper reports.
May 14 – Frank Costello is convicted of tax evasion and is sentenced to federal prison.
May 18 – Over thirty-five known mobsters are observed by federal agents in a meeting in New York.
October 17–18 – After nearly a year of inactivity, federal agents observe a meeting among organized crime figures in Binghamton, New York.

Arts and literature

Births
October 11 – Eduardo Arellano Félix, Mexican drug lord and Tijuana Cartel member

Deaths

Notes

Organized crime
Years in organized crime